Jennie Caroline Eleonore Johansson (born 15 June 1988) is a Swedish competitive swimmer. She competed for Sweden at the 2012 Summer Olympics. She won gold in the 50-metre breaststroke at the 2015 World Aquatics Championships in Kazan, Russia.

Jennie Johansson competed in 2016 Summer Olympics in Rio de Janeiro where she participated in the 100 m breaststroke and  4 × 100 m medley relay events, but she did not reach the finals.

In November 2016 it was revealed that Jennie Johansson and fellow Swedish swimmer Michelle Coleman had been barred from participating in international events representing Sweden, due to disciplinary reasons. They were still entitled to use national team training facilities.

Johansson publicly announced her retirement from the sport in March 2018.

Career in 2017 

In March 2017 Jennie Johansson competed in the Edinburgh International Swim Meet and won the 100 m breaststroke event with a time of 1:07.43. She also won the 50 m breaststroke silver with a time of 31.30.

Jennie Johansson competed in the 2017 Stockholm Swim Cup in the 50 m breaststroke event which she won the prelims with a time of 30.39, setting a world lead. In the finals she clocked a time of 30.57 and won gold medal in Eriksdal. In the 100 m breaststroke event she won the first place with a time of 1:06.30 which is a new Swedish (national) record and personal best.

References

Swedish female breaststroke swimmers
Swimmers at the 2012 Summer Olympics
Swimmers at the 2016 Summer Olympics
Olympic swimmers of Sweden
1988 births
Living people
European Aquatics Championships medalists in swimming
Upsala Simsällskap swimmers
SK Neptun swimmers
World Aquatics Championships medalists in swimming